Royal Consort Yongjeol of the Gyeongju Gim clan (Hangul: 용절덕비 김씨, Hanja: 容節德妃 金氏; ; d. 1102) or before called as Princess Yeonheung was the fourth wife of King Jeongjong of Goryeo.

She was born in Gyeongju as the daughter of Gim Won-chung (김원충), son of Gim In-wi (김인위) and her younger sister became Munjong of Goryeo's 5th wife. In 1040 (6th year reign of Jeongjong of Goryeo), she was chosen to be his 4th wife and got married not long after that. She then given royal title as Princess Yeonheung (연흥궁주, 延興宮主). Meanwhile, she later died in 1102 (7th year reign of Sukjong of Goryeo) and Posthumously honoured as Virtuous Consort (덕비, 德妃) under King Sukjong's command with the name of Yongjeol (용절, 容節).

References

External links
Royal Consort Yongjeol on Encykorea .
용절덕비 on Doosan Encyclopedia .

Royal consorts of the Goryeo Dynasty
1102 deaths
11th-century Korean people
11th-century Korean women 
Year of birth unknown
Gim clan of Gyeongju